Kurt Becker KG was a German manufacturer of die-cast miniature cars. The factory was located in Berlin, Germany.

History 

Little is known about the history of the Kurt Becker KG, other than that it was founded by the German entrepreneur Kurt Becker from Berlin, presumably shortly after World War II. As far as known Kurt Becker KG only produced one series of miniature cars around 1947.

Racing cars 
Around 1947 Kurt Becker KG produced a series of die-cast miniatures of the pre-war Auto Union racing car in scale 1:43. The miniature was of the first racing car of the Auto Union series, the Type A, more specifically of the very rare 'long-tail' version. This car was raced on the AVUS in Berlin in 1934 by German racing car driver August Momberger. The choice of model by Kurt Becker KG was unusual, since the Auto Union racing cars had their heyday in the 1930s as the flagships of Nazi-Germany, and never returned to the race tracks after the war.

This series of Auto Union racing cars by Kurt Becker KG was known as the B1300 series. The racing cars were available in six different color combinations:

Off-white/kaki color with red seat (matte paint)
Green with red seat (matte paint)
Dark red with off-white/kaki seat
Light red with blue seat
Dark blue with red seat (matte paint)
Light blue with red seat (matte paint)

Very rare and unique for miniature cars is that four of the color variations were finished in matte paint. The reason for this is believed to be that the miniatures were painted with left-overs of German military paint, which was practically the only paint available in early post-war Germany.

External links
Story about a box of unused old stock models by Kurt Becker KG discovered in Frankfurt around 1990
Information about and images of the original Auto Union Type A 'long-tail' racing car

Die-cast toys
Toy cars and trucks
Defunct manufacturing companies of Germany
Model manufacturers of Germany
Toy companies of Germany
Toy companies established in 1947 
German companies established in 1947